Bandrek is a traditional hot, sweet and spicy beverage native to Sundanese of West Java, Indonesia. The Sundanese people who live in the cool, highlands consume bandrek to warm themselves at night and during cold weather.

This hot beverage is made of a mixture of ginger water, palm sugar and cinnamon. Other ingredients such as, star anise, cloves, coriander seeds, cardamom pods, lemongrass, and a small amount of black pepper are sometimes added. Milk can also be added to the mix, depending on one's taste. Sweetened condensed milk or coconut milk is commonly used for this purpose.

It is believed that bandrek has a healing effect on minor health problems, such as sore throat.

Variations
Sometimes pieces of young coconut flesh are added as well. The latest variant includes pieces of durian placed into the bandrek.

See also

 Bajigur
 Masala chai
 List of hot beverages
 List of Indonesian beverages
 Wedang Jahe

References

Indonesian drinks
Sundanese cuisine
Non-alcoholic drinks
Hot drinks